Ain't It Grand Boys: A Collection of Unissued Gems is a 1995 two-disc compilation of previously unreleased recordings by the Clancy Brothers and Tommy Makem. All the tracks were taken from various live performances from the early to mid-1960s.

One of the leaders of the American folk music revival, Pete Seeger, played the banjo on six of the tracks on the album, including "This Land Is Your Land," for which he also sings the lead.

Reception

Entertainment Weekly critic, Bob Cannon, lauded the album for "bristling with wit and passion." The reviewer for All Music praised the songs on the album as some of the Clancy Brothers and Tommy Makem's "most spirited on record."

Track listing

The songs were adapted and arranged by the Clancy Brothers and Tommy Makem.

Personnel

Paddy Clancy - vocals, harmonica
Tom Clancy - vocals
Liam Clancy - vocals, guitar
Tommy Makem - vocals, banjo, tin whistle
Pete Seeger - vocals, banjo
Bruce Langhorne - guitar

References 

The Clancy Brothers albums
Columbia Records albums
1995 albums